Rego Park station may refer to:
 Rego Park station (LIRR)
 63rd Drive–Rego Park (IND Queens Boulevard Line)